Donnavan Carter (born April 20, 1975) is a former Canadian football linebacker and safety and currently the special teams coordinator for the University of Guelph Gryphons. He played for seven seasons for the Toronto Argonauts, Ottawa Renegades, Hamilton Tiger-Cats, and Winnipeg Blue Bombers of the Canadian Football League. He was drafted fourth overall by the Argonauts in the 2000 CFL Draft. He played college football for the Northern Illinois Huskies.

References

1975 births
Living people
Canadian players of American football
Canadian football linebackers
Hamilton Tiger-Cats players
Northern Illinois Huskies football players
Ottawa Renegades players
Players of Canadian football from Ontario
Canadian football people from Toronto
Toronto Argonauts players
Winnipeg Blue Bombers players